Denys Kolchin (born 13 October 1977) is a former professional Ukrainian football defender and current football manager of Balkany Zorya.

Career
He last played for FC Dnister Ovidiopol and worked as a coach of another club from Black Sea region Zhemchuzhyna Odessa.

Honours

Individual
 Ukrainian Second League best coach: 2016–17

See also
 1994 UEFA European Under-16 Championship

External links
 
 

1977 births
Living people
Footballers from Odesa
Ukrainian footballers
Ukrainian expatriate footballers
FC Chornomorets Odesa players
FC Chornomorets-2 Odesa players
FC Kryvbas Kryvyi Rih players
FC Kryvbas-2 Kryvyi Rih players
MFC Mykolaiv players
FC Dnister Ovidiopol players
Expatriate footballers in Russia
Ukrainian expatriate sportspeople in Russia
Ukrainian Premier League players
Ukrainian football managers
FC Zhemchuzhyna Odesa managers
Ukraine under-21 international footballers
Ukraine youth international footballers
FC Nyva Vinnytsia managers
FC Balkany Zorya managers
Association football defenders
FC Mashuk-KMV Pyatigorsk players